Toubakoro or Toubacoro  is a rural commune in the Cercle of Banamba in the Koulikoro Region of south-western Mali. The commune contains 21 villages.

References

External links
.

Communes of Koulikoro Region